Aprosdoketophis is a genus of snake in the family Colubridae  that contains the sole species Aprosdoketophis andreonei.

It is endemic to Somalia.

References 

Endemic fauna of Somalia
Colubrids
Monotypic snake genera
Reptiles of Somalia